A natriuretic peptide is a peptide that induces natriuresis, which is the excretion of sodium by the kidneys.

Known natriuretic peptides include the following:
 atrial natriuretic peptide, also known as ANP
 brain natriuretic peptide, also known as BNP (B-type natriuretic peptide)
 C-type natriuretic peptide, also known as CNP
 dendroaspis natriuretic peptide, also known as DNP
 urodilatin

See also 
 Nesiritide
 Carperitide
 CD-NP
 Ularitide

External links
 

Urinary system